Hutchinson County is a county in the U.S. state of South Dakota. As of the 2020 United States Census, the population was 7,427. Its county seat is Olivet. The county was created in 1862 and organized in 1871; it was named for John Hutchinson, first territorial secretary.

History
Hutchinson County was created by act of the territorial legislature on May 8, 1862. Its boundaries included portions of present-day Davison and Hanson Counties, and part of what is presently Hutchinson County was within the boundaries of Jayne County. Maxwell City was established as the county seat, and it remained there until October 1873 when it was moved to Olivet following an election. On 13 January 1871, the territorial legislature established the present county boundaries and completed its governing organization. In two actions in January 1873, the legislature divided Hutchinson County into two counties - the northern half was named Armstrong County, with Milltown as the seat. However, in 1879, Armstrong County was dissolved and its area re-annexed into Hutchinson County.

Geography
The James River flows south-southeasterly through the central part of Hutchinson County. The county's terrain consists of rolling hills, with the area largely devoted to agriculture. The terrain slopes to the river valley from both sides, with the county's highest point at its southwest corner: 1,880' (573m) ASL.

Major highways

 U.S. Highway 18
 U.S. Highway 81
 South Dakota Highway 25
 South Dakota Highway 37
 South Dakota Highway 44

Adjacent counties

 Hanson County - north
 McCook County - northeast
 Turner County - east
 Yankton County - southeast
 Bon Homme County - south
 Charles Mix County - southwest
 Douglas County - west
 Davison County - northwest

Protected areas
 Mogck Slough State Public Shooting Area
 Weigher Slough State Public Shooting Area

Lakes

 Lake Dimock
 Lake Menno
 Silver Lake
 Tripp Lake

Demographics

2000 census
As of the 2000 United States Census, there were 8,075 people, 3,190 households, and 2,191 families in the county. The population density was 10 people per square mile (4/km2). There were 3,517 housing units at an average density of 4 per square mile (2/km2). The racial makeup of the county was 98.82% White, 0.09% Black or African American, 0.57% Native American, 0.10% Asian, 0.06% from other races, and 0.36% from two or more races. 0.52% of the population were Hispanic or Latino of any race.

63% of the population of Hutchinson County reports German ancestry and 8.3% speak German at home.

There were 3,190 households, out of which 28.00% had children under the age of 18 living with them, 61.50% were married couples living together, 4.40% had a female householder with no husband present, and 31.30% were non-families. 29.60% of all households were made up of individuals, and 18.50% had someone living alone who was 65 years of age or older.  The average household size was 2.43 and the average family size was 3.03.

The county population contained 24.90% under the age of 18, 5.60% from 18 to 24, 22.10% from 25 to 44, 21.20% from 45 to 64, and 26.20% who were 65 years of age or older. The median age was 43 years. For every 100 females there were 94.90 males. For every 100 females age 18 and over, there were 90.70 males.

The median income for a household in the county was $30,026, and the median income for a family was $37,715. Males had a median income of $25,654 versus $18,141 for females. The per capita income for the county was $15,922. About 9.60% of families and 13.00% of the population were below the poverty line, including 18.30% of those under age 18 and 11.30% of those age 65 or over.

2010 census
As of the 2010 United States Census, there were 7,343 people, 2,930 households, and 1,871 families in the county. The racial makeup of the county was 97.4% white, 0.7% American Indian, 0.4% black or African American, 0.2% Asian, 0.5% from other races, and 0.9% from two or more races. Those of Hispanic or Latino origin made up 1.6% of the population. In terms of ancestry, 67.7% were German, 8.7% were Russian, 7.4% were Norwegian, 6.9% were Irish, and 3.6% were American.

Of the 2,930 households, 24.6% had children under the age of 18 living with them, 55.6% were married couples living together, 5.0% had a female householder with no husband present, 36.1% were non-families, and 33.4% of all households were made up of individuals. The average household size was 2.22 and the average family size was 2.82. The median age was 46.8 years.

The median income for a household in the county was $39,310 and the median income for a family was $52,390. Males had a median income of $35,180 versus $25,417 for females. The per capita income for the county was $21,944. About 6.4% of families and 10.4% of the population were below the poverty line, including 11.5% of those under age 18 and 14.5% of those age 65 or over.

Mennonites and Hutterites
Hutchinson County is the most heavily Mennonite-populated county of South Dakota. German-speaking Mennonites from Russia settled in the county beginning in 1874 until the early 1880s. South Dakota has the nation's largest population of Hutterites, a communal Anabaptist group that emigrated also from Russia during the same period as the Mennonites, with whom they share the Anabaptist faith. Hutterites live in communities each of about 150 people. Wolf Creek Colony is in Hutchinson County, where the Wolf meets the James River. This colony is west of Freeman and north of Olivet and Menno. Other Hutterite communities in the county are Maxwell Colony, New Elm Spring Colony, Old Elm Spring Colony, and Tschetter Colony.

Communities

Cities

 Freeman
 Parkston

Towns

 Dimock
 Menno
 Olivet (county seat)
 Tripp

Census-designated places

 Kaylor
 Maxwell Colony
 Milltown
 New Elm Spring Colony
 Old Elm Spring Colony
 Tschetter Colony
 Wolf Creek Colony

Unincorporated communities
 Clayton
 Lake Tripp
 Wolf Creek

Townships

Capital
Clayton
Cross Plains
Fair
Foster
German
Grandview
Kassel
Kaylor
Kulm
Liberty
Mittown
Molan
Oak Hollow
Pleasant
Sharon
Silver Lake
Starr
Susquehanna
Sweet
Valley
Wittenberg
Wolf Creek

Politics
Like most of South Dakota, Hutchinson County is overwhelmingly Republican. Only one Democratic presidential candidate – Franklin D. Roosevelt in his 1932 landslide – has ever carried the county. Surprisingly, in the 1928 and 1972 Republican landslides Hutchinson County actually voted more Democratic than the nation at-large due to German Lutheran anti-Prohibition voting for Al Smith in the first case and a strong “favorite son” vote for George McGovern in the latter. Apart from these two hugely anomalous cases, only four Democrats have ever topped forty percent of the county's vote, and only four statewide Republican nominees failed to win a majority.

See also
 National Register of Historic Places listings in Hutchinson County, South Dakota

References

 
1871 establishments in Dakota Territory
States and territories established in 1871